Liberty Township is a township in Saline County, Kansas, in the United States.

Liberty Township was organized in 1872.

References

Townships in Saline County, Kansas
Townships in Kansas